Aagje Vanwalleghem (born 24 October 1987, in Poção de Pedras, Brazil) is a Belgian gymnast. She was originally named Ana Maria Pereira da Silva and was adopted by a Belgian teacher.<ref
name=ptwiki>Portuguese Wikipedia article.</ref>

Aagje competed in the 2004 Olympic games and has taken part in numerous other international competitions.

Early life

Born in north-eastern Brazil, Aagje Vanwalleghem was gravely ill when, at the age of four months, she was adopted by a Belgian teacher, Hilde Vanwalleghem.

At the age of seven Aagje made contact with her Brazilian family.  In her Belgian family, which lived at Wevelgem in West Flanders, she grew up with two sisters, Lieke and Auke, who were born in Ethiopia and were also adopted. As Aagje reached the age of 18, three more Ethiopian girls were adopted, Aster, Ele and June.

As a child she became involved in gymnastics and for some years trained locally in Wevelgem with Hilde Masselis.

Gymnastics career

In 1999 Aagje took advantage of a new programme for talented gymnasts and began to train with the Dutch coach Gerrit Beltman in Opmeer (North Holland). The following year she and Beltman moved to Ghent. However, in 2001 Beltman went back to the Netherlands. Aagje remained in Ghent and took on a new coach, Youri Kiritchenko, who was impatient with her, and this resulted in a hip fracture. Aagje quickly went back to Beltman, but lost a whole season, because she underwent two operations in 2002.

Aagje's first success at senior international level came in 2003 with World Cup bronze medals in the vault in Rio de Janeiro and on the uneven bars in Thessaloniki. In 2004, she represented Belgium at the Athens Olympics, qualifying for the all-round final, and was voted the most promising Belgian youngster of the year. In 2005, she again won a World Cup bronze medal in the vault, this time in Paris. Also in 2005 she took a bronze medal in the vault at the European Championships in Debrecen. She was the first Belgian to win a medal at this level.

Further success in the World Cup came in 2008, with silver medals in the vault in Stuttgart and in Ostrava and on the uneven bars in Ostrava. In the World Cup final in Madrid Aagje won a bronze medal in the vault. However, the same year she underwent three operations on her right knee and failed to qualify for the Beijing Olympics.

Success returned in 2009 with World Cup silver medals in the vault and on the uneven bars at Cottbus. Also that year Aagje won gold on the beam and uneven bars and silver on the floor in a domestic competition in Ghent. 2011 saw her at the European Championships in Berlin, where she reached the final on the uneven bars and also the all-round final. In January 2012 she was a member of the team which came 5th in the Olympic Test Event in London.

Retirement

In early 2012 it was expected that Aagje would represent Belgium at the London Olympic Games later in the year. However, on 28 March 2012 she announced that she was retiring from gymnastics with immediate effect, saying that she could no longer cope both physically and mentally.

Personal life
In 2016 Aagje married former pole-vaulter .

References and notes

External links 
 Official website (Dutch language). Retrieved 9 January 2012.

1987 births
Living people
Belgian women gymnasts
Belgian female artistic gymnasts
Sportspeople from Porto Alegre
People from Wevelgem
Olympic gymnasts of Belgium
Gymnasts at the 2004 Summer Olympics
Belgian adoptees